Benjamin Wisner Bacon (January 15, 1860 – February 1, 1932) was an American theologian. He was born in Litchfield, Connecticut and graduated from Yale College in 1881 and Yale Divinity School in 1884. After serving in pastorates at Old Lyme, Connecticut (1884–1889), and at Oswego, New York (1889–1896), he was made an instructor in New Testament Greek at Yale Divinity School and became in 1897 professor of New Testament criticism and exegesis.  The degrees D.D., Litt.D., and LL.D. were conferred upon him.  Besides contributions to the Hibbert Journal and to the American Journal of Theology (of both of which he was chosen as an editor), his writings include:  
 The Genesis of Genesis (1891)  
 Triple Tradition of the Exodus (1894)  
 The Sermon on the Mount (1902)  
 The Story of St. Paul (1904)  
 An Introduction to the New Testament (1907)  
 The Founding of the Church (1909)  
 The Fourth Gospel in Research and Debate (1909)  
 Jesus the Son of God (1911)  
 The Making of the New Testament (1912)  
 Theodore Thornton Munger (1914)
 Is Mark a Roman Gospel? (1919)
 The Gospel of Mark: Its composition and date (1925)

References

External links
 
 
 
 

1860 births
1932 deaths
19th-century players of American football
American biblical scholars
American religious writers
Yale Bulldogs football players
Yale College alumni
Yale Divinity School alumni
People from Litchfield, Connecticut
Players of American football from Connecticut